is a private junior college in Chūō-ku, Osaka, Japan. It was established in 1968. It has been attached to Osaka Jogakuin College since 2004.

External links
 

Christianity in Osaka
Educational institutions established in 1968
Private universities and colleges in Japan
Japanese junior colleges
Universities and colleges in Osaka
Women's universities and colleges in Japan